= Climate theory =

Climate theory may refer to:

- Any theory in Climatology (Climate Science)
- The climate theory of Montesquieu
- Global warming conspiracy theory, theory that global warming science is being falsified
